The Yellowknife Historical Society, in the Northwest Territories, Canada, was first formed in 2002 as the NWT Mining Heritage Society and began planning for the creation of a mining museum for Yellowknife and the Northwest Territories and Nunavut as a whole. In 2017, the society was renamed the Yellowknife Historical Society to broaden its mandate to create a community museum for Yellowknife that would include all cultural aspects of the city's history.

External links
 Yellowknife Historical Society website

Affiliations
The Museum is affiliated with: CMA, CHIN, and Virtual Museum of Canada.

References

Organizations established in 2002
Mining in Canada
Mining in the Northwest Territories
Mining organizations
Museums in the Northwest Territories
Organizations based in the Northwest Territories
Culture of Yellowknife
Proposed museums in Canada